Barbara O'Neill is an Australian naturopath and lecturer on health issues who, in 2019, was banned for life by the New South Wales Health Care Complaints Commission (HCCC) from providing free or paid health services. The ban followed an HCCC investigation which found she lacked any health related qualifications, a degree, diploma, or membership in an accredited health organisation. It also found that she provided dangerous, unsupported health advice to vulnerable groups. This included advising parents to feed their infants raw goat milk or almond milk blended with dates or banana instead of formula, and recommending that cancer patients forgo chemotherapy in favour of baking soda wraps and dietary changes.

She is married to Michael O'Neill, the founder of the Informed Medical Options Party.

Activities 

Although O'Neill has promoted her services as a naturopath, nutritionist, and health educator since at least 2004, she lacks relevant credentials. She has rejected the claim that her health advice is not evidence-based.

She ran the Misty Mountain Health Retreat near Kempsey, NSW with her husband, charging clients up to AUD$3,100 per week for treatments and health retreats. She also provided for-fee telephone consultations. According to O'Neill's website, she provided detox services claiming to aid in recovery from heart disease, diabetes, hormonal imbalance, chronic fatigue, candida/fungus, drug addiction, cancer, heartburn, and obesity.

Her YouTube videos were viewed about 700,000 times as of mid-October 2019. As a member of the Seventh-day Adventist Church, she has spoken at many church venues. She has previously provided health retreats and wellness programs in Australia and the Cook Islands and continues to conduct them in New Zealand and the U.S.

Questionable claims

Cancer 

According to the HCCC investigation, O'Neill falsely claimed to be able to cure cancer and urged patients not to use chemotherapy.

O'Neill promoted the discredited claim that cancer is a fungus. She urged her clients to treat their cancer with baking soda wraps and claimed, without evidence, that one doctor had cured 90% of his patients' cancer with baking soda injections.

She also encouraged her clients to treat their cancer with probiotics and by avoiding fruit and wheat for six weeks.

Anti-vaccination 

O'Neill discouraged immunisation, claiming that vaccines are unnecessary. In one of her YouTube videos, she stated that "children can be naturally vaccinated against tetanus by drinking plenty of water, going to bed early, not eating junk food and running around the hills". She further claimed, without evidence, that "neurotoxins in vaccines have caused an epidemic of ADHD, autism, epilepsy and cot death". O'Neill has campaigned against the Australian No Jab No Pay pro-immunisation initiative.

Antibiotics 

In several of her YouTube videos, O'Neill discourages the use of antibiotics, claiming, without evidence, that they cause cancer. She has told pregnant women it is unnecessary to take antibiotics for Strep B because "no baby has ever died from Strep B catching out of birth". However, the Royal Australian College of Obstetricians and Gynaecologists' statistics show that 14% of newborns who contract early-onset Strep B die, and that antibiotics can reduce this risk dramatically.

Dietary Advice for Infants 

O'Neill has recommended that parents who are unable to breastfeed their infant use substitutes besides formula. These have included unpasteurised goat milk and a mix of almond milk and dates or bananas. Co-author of the National Health and Medical Research Council's Australian infant feeding guidelines, Professor Jane Scott, has stated this advice is "definitely not safe," and that "there is a real danger here for infants as these will not support healthy growth and development".

In O'Neill's opinion, parents should not feed their children solid food or grains until their molars have emerged. She has stated this nutrition advice is based solely on her personal experience.

HCCC Investigation 

Between October 2018 and January 2019, the New South Wales Health Care Complaints Commission (HCCC) received many complaints about O'Neill's health advice. These included a complaint that the advice she provided regarding infant nutrition could cause death if followed, where she disclosed her directives were not based on any official guidance or evidence. 

The Commission found that some of her recommendations were based on ideas espoused by Tullio Simoncini, an Italian former oncologist and alternative medicine advocate incarcerated following a conviction for fraud and manslaughter following the death of one of his patients. Some of her guidance was based on the views of doctors who were sued by patients for not providing appropriate treatment. When the HCCC noted these facts to O'Neill, she stated that she still intended to use their advice.

The HCCC also found that O'Neill cannot recognise and provide health advice within the limits of her training and experience and had not maintained records of the advice she provided to clients. While O'Neill has claimed to have received diplomas in naturopathy, nutrition, and dietetics from two now defunct organisations, the HCCC found that she did not have any health related degree or diploma.

O'Neill claimed that she was merely providing clients with information, rather than advice. She further stated that the advice provided was evidence-based, and that she had not claimed to be able to cure cancer.

The HCCC ultimately found the O'Neill's actions had breached five clauses of the Code of Conduct for Unregistered Health Practitioners.

On September 24, 2019, The HCCC indefinitely banned O'Neill from providing health services, regardless of whether or not she accepted payment for doing so. This precludes her from giving lectures, public speaking or seeing clients. A HCCC spokesperson said that O'Neill's activities were being monitored closely and the prohibition order applies in the Australian states of New South Wales, Victoria, Queensland and South Australia. He also stated, "In general, if the material is accessible in [those jurisdictions] online, then it is considered to be delivering a health service", and that "Presenting health education in any form or delivering health services, would be a breach of her prohibition order."

Following the decision, a petition was circulated calling for the HCCC to reverse its decision. As of October 2019, the petition had gained 36,000 signatures. Accompanying the petition, is a statement from O'Neill:  “It looks a bit dark now, but the Great God of the Universe will not let His wonderful health truth to be eliminated, regardless of how men and women may try.” Since the ban, O'Neill has claimed she is a victim of a Nazi-style propaganda campaign.

Investigation into charity 

In late 2019, O’Neill and her husband's Misty Mountain Health Retreat came under investigation by the Australian Charities and Not-for-profits Commission (ACNC) for alleged breaches of charity law. Under its health promotion charity status, the Retreat had received government grants and various tax concessions. In defending its status, the Retreat had claimed it had provided diet, exercise and health advice to indigenous Australians and people with chronic and terminal illnesses. The Retreat had previously been called 'The Aboriginal Healing Centre'. The retreat charges up to AUD$3,100 a week for health and cancer "treatments".

Although she has been banned from providing health advice in Australia, O'Neill's website states that "Barbara O’Neill, author, educator, naturopath and nutritionist (retired), is… available for public speaking to companies, community groups, or churches outside of Australia and is sure to please those looking for motivation to live a longer, healthier and happier life." The month following the HCCC's decision, O'Neill was scheduled to conduct a wellness program in the US at a cost of $2,350 per person.

Cook Islands 

In October 2019, the Cook Islands Secretary of Health Josephine Aumea Herman expressed concern after learning O’Neill had been running health workshops in Rarotonga, and referred the matter onto the chief medical officer of the Cook Islands.

Herman said: "We will follow up on this with her [O’Neill], so in the future she cannot practise healthcare here without the proper registration – which means an annual practising certificate in her country of origin, and other documentation. We must ensure the Cook Islands population remains safe."

References

External links 
 HCCC - Statement of decision (pdf) on Mrs Barbara O’Neill - 24 September 2019

Alternative medicine
Australian anti-vaccination activists
Australian fraudsters
Australian Seventh-day Adventists
Date of birth missing (living people)
Living people
Medical controversies in Australia
Place of birth missing (living people)
Year of birth missing (living people)